The 1926 South Carolina Gamecocks football team represented the University of South Carolina during the 1926 Southern Conference football season. Led by Branch Bocock in his second and final season as head coach, the Gamecocks compiled an overall record of 6–4 with a mark of 4–2 in conference play, tying for fourth place in the SoCon.

Schedule

References

South Carolina
South Carolina Gamecocks football seasons
South Carolina Gamecocks football